Robert George McCutcheon (1841 – 20 October 1918) was an Irish-born Australian politician.

He was born in Omagh to John McCutcheon and Margaret Bothwell. His family migrated to Victoria around 1858; Robert spent a year in Calcutta as a printer and then became a journalist in Ballarat and Port Fiary. On 13 December 1867 he married Mary Ebblewhite, a prominent member of the Australian Women's National League; they would have eight children. In 1873 he moved to Melbourne to assume his brother's place in the printing firm Mason, Firth & McCutcheon, which he owned exclusively from 1878. He was elected to the Victorian Legislative Assembly for St Kilda; a Liberal, he nonetheless opposed Thomas Bent's government in 1908. He was a minister without portfolio from 1915 to 1916, when he resigned; he retired from politics in 1917. McCutcheon died in St Kilda in 1918.

References

1841 births
1918 deaths
Nationalist Party of Australia members of the Parliament of Victoria
Members of the Victorian Legislative Assembly
People from Omagh
Irish emigrants to colonial Australia
Australian printers